Sam Bakhtiar was a Persian American fitness entrepreneur and author.

Life and career
Sam was born in Tehran. At the age of 11, he and his mother left Iran as refugees to the USA. Upon leaving Iran, he moved to the United States. He held a bachelor's degree of sports science and life science from the Pennsylvania State University and a doctorate from Los Angeles College of Chiropractic. He was the co-founder of The Camp Fitness Franchise. He was one of the finalists of the Ernst & Young Entrepreneur of the Year Award in 2017.

Death 
Sam died on 23 December 2020 at the age of 47. His death according to a comment made by his official YouTube channel in response to a question about his cause of death was "Heart problems".

Books
 Total Body Transformation Secrets: Fitness Concepts Formula 
 Becoming a One-Percenter

References

External links 
 
 

1973 births
American exercise instructors
2020 deaths
Iranian emigrants to the United States